Henrik Hietakari (6 April 1894 – 31 August 1946) was a Finnish long-distance runner. He competed in the marathon at the 1924 Summer Olympics.

References

External links
 

1894 births
1946 deaths
People from Lappeenranta
People from Viipuri Province (Grand Duchy of Finland)
Athletes (track and field) at the 1924 Summer Olympics
Finnish male long-distance runners
Finnish male marathon runners
Olympic athletes of Finland
Sportspeople from South Karelia